Six ships of the Royal Navy have borne the name HMS Ant:

HMS Ant was an 8-gun schooner, formerly the French Arabe, captured 1797 and renamed , renamed Ant 1798, sold 1815.
 was a 2-gun cutter, launched 1815, used as a tender, in dockyard service from 1817, later as Royal Victoria Yard Craft No.1, sold 1869.
 was a gunboat, ex-merchant ship, bought 1862, used on the New Zealand station, sold 1864.
 was an  launched 1873, used as boom defence vessel 1917, as target 1921, broken up 1926.
 was a tender, launched 1913, sold 1924, converted to excursion steamer Rangitoto in New Zealand, broken up 1968.

References

Royal Navy ship names